Mark Schofield (born 31 March 1974) is a British former professional tennis player.

A native of Blackburn, Schofield was an eight-time Lancashire singles champion and played one year on tour as a professional player. He featured in the doubles main draw at Queen's in 1991 and in qualifying at Wimbledon in 1992.

Schofield left the international circuit in 1993 to concentrate on coaching.

References

External links
 
 

1974 births
Living people
British male tennis players
English male tennis players
Sportspeople from Blackburn
Tennis people from Lancashire